"R" v Attorney General for England and Wales [2003] UKPC 22 is a New Zealand contract law case, heard by the Privy Council acting as the final court of appeal of New Zealand and not as part of the judiciary of the UK, relating to duress and undue influence.

Facts
After the Gulf War, a Special Air Service soldier of the Bravo Two Zero patrol, known in the proceedings as "R", was told to sign a confidentiality agreement or be demoted. He signed. Then he returned to New Zealand. He got a publishing contract for his memoirs, about material in the Gulf War.

The New Zealand Court of Appeal denied an injunction, but allowed an account of profits and an assessment of damages for breach of contract. R appealed to the Privy Council, contending that he was under duress when he signed the contract, given the threat of demotion. Additionally R contended that the contract was signed under undue influence, given the position of the MOD in relation to him.

Advice
The Privy Council advised that the contract was not avoidable for duress. Lord Hoffmann said there was no illegitimate pressure, so no duress. That first element is "pressure amounting to compulsion of the will of the victim and the second was the illegitimacy of the pressure".

In addition, the court reviewed whether a type of relationship existed between the Crown and the Ministry of Defence that raised the presumption of undue influence. The court found that such a relationship had in law arisen but went on to state that, for this presumption to arise, there must be a transaction that requires explanation. They held that this was not a transaction that required explanation.

See also

English contract law
Iniquitous pressure in English law
Lloyds Bank Ltd v Bundy [1975] QB 326
Williams v. Walker-Thomas Furniture Co. 350 F.2d 445 (C.A. D.C. 1965)

References

Judicial Committee of the Privy Council cases on appeal from New Zealand
2003 in New Zealand law
New Zealand contract case law
2003 in case law